Tommy Joe Eagles (April 3, 1949 – July 30, 1994) was the head basketball coach of the Louisiana Tech Bulldogs from 1985 to 1989 and the Auburn Tigers from 1989 to 1994. He was head coach of the University of New Orleans men's basketball team, but died before he ever coached a game there due to a heart attack he suffered during a recruiting trip on July 30, 1994. Before his coaching stint at Louisiana Tech, Eagles served as head coach at Cedar Creek High School in Ruston and Simsboro High School in Simsboro, both in Lincoln Parish.

Each year, Louisiana Tech University presents the Tommy Joe Eagles Award to the member of the Louisiana Tech Men's Basketball team who shows the best all-around combination of work ethic, academic ability, character, and attitude. Past recipients include Brian Martin (2004) and Shawn Oliverson (2010). Auburn University presents the Paul Lambert/Tommy Joe Eagles Memorial Trophy for Leadership, the most prestigious award of the men's basketball program, at the end of each season. Past recipients include current Auburn Assistant Coach Wes Flanigan (1996, 1997) and Daymeon Fishback (2000).

Eagles played basketball and graduated in 1967 from Doyline High School in Doyline in south Webster Parish, Louisiana. He was one of three children of the late Edward P. and Juanita W. Eagles. His siblings were M. E. "Bo" Eagles, a businessman from Houston, Texas, and Anita E. Darbonne of Minden.

Head coaching record

References

1949 births
1994 deaths
American men's basketball players
Auburn Tigers men's basketball coaches
Basketball coaches from Louisiana
Basketball players from Louisiana
College men's basketball head coaches in the United States
High school basketball coaches in the United States
Louisiana Tech Bulldogs basketball players
Louisiana Tech Bulldogs basketball coaches
People from Webster Parish, Louisiana
Sportspeople from Ruston, Louisiana